Lucignano is a village in Tuscany, central Italy, administratively a frazione of the comune of Montespertoli, Metropolitan City of Florence. At the time of the 2001 census its population was 232.

Lucignano is about 30 km from Florence and 5 km from Montespertoli.

References 

Frazioni of the Province of Florence